Melanodes is a monotypic moth genus in the family Geometridae. Its only species, Melanodes anthracitaria, the black geometrid, is found in Australia, more specifically in southern Queensland, New South Wales, Victoria, South Australia, and Tasmania. The genus and species were described by Achille Guenée in 1857.

Both the larvae and the adults have two forms. The caterpillars can be green or brown. The adults are slate grey with black wavy lines. One form has pale yellow bands on the wings, which are not present on the other form.

The wingspan is about 50 mm for females and 40 mm for males. The moth flies from August to January depending on the location.

The larvae feed on Eucalyptus species.

References

Nacophorini
Moths described in 1857
Moths of Australia
Monotypic moth genera